Carissa Wilkes (born 12 November 1986) is a road cyclist from New Zealand. She represented her nation at the 2007 UCI Road World Championships.

References

External links
 profile at Procyclingstats.com

1986 births
New Zealand female cyclists
Living people
Place of birth missing (living people)